= TSSR =

TSSR may refer to:

- Tajik Soviet Socialist Republic, now Tajikistan
- Turkmen Soviet Socialist Republic, now Turkmenistan
